The Hardin Bridge is a bridge in Hardin, Illinois that carries Illinois Route 16 and Illinois Route 100 across the Illinois River. The bridge is the southernmost bridge on the river. It is also one of three crossings used by IL 100, the other two being in Florence and Beardstown. The bridge's western abutment is the western terminus of IL 16. It was built in 1930 and rehabilitated in 2003–04.

Dedicated on July 23, 1931, the bridge is named after Joseph M. Page (1845-1938). Page served in the Union Army during the Civil War and settled in Jerseyville after that conflict. Joe Page was involved in politics and served five times as Mayor of Jerseyville. Besides being responsible for the construction of the bridge that is named in his honor, he was instrumental in the creation of Pere Marquette State Park, in the establishing the area's water and electric light plants, and in bringing telephone service into Jerseyville.

External links
Hardin Bridge at Bridgehunter.com
Video of Bridge Lowering   at YouTube.com

Bridges completed in 1930
Transportation buildings and structures in Calhoun County, Illinois
Bridges over the Illinois River
Truss bridges in the United States
Vertical lift bridges in Illinois
Great River Road
Road bridges in Illinois
1930 establishments in Illinois